Chowronghee is a 1968 Indian Bengali drama film by Pinaki Bhushan Mukherjee, starring Uttam Kumar and Subhendu Chatterjee who played the lead role and Biswajit Chatterjee, Supriya Devi and Anjana Bhowmick in supporting role. The music of the film composed by Ashima Bhattachariya who also produced this film. The film is based on a Bengali novel of the same name by Shankar and was a huge hit in its own right. The film is regarded as one of the greatest film in Bengali cinema and for Uttam's career.

Plot

The movie revolves around the experiences of the characters the author Shankar meets while working at one of the largest and most reputed hotels of Kolkata, Hotel Shahjahan. At the end of the movie, most of the characters experience tragedy, in one form or another.

The major characters Shankar encounters with are:

 Mr. Satyasundar (Sata) Bose is Shankar's co-worker and the receptionist at the hotel. Mr. Bose, played by Uttam Kumar, is shown to be extremely friendly, benevolent and loved by all. Being an efficient worker, he takes care of all the guests very well, including guarding their secrets, and earns the respect and admiration of his boss, Marco Polo (played by Utpal Dutt). He and Ms. Sujata Mitra (played by Anjana Bhowmick), an air hostess who visits the hotel frequently, become close they decide to marry. Sata resigns from his profession as a receptionist in search for a better life after their wedding. Sujata too decides to resign from her work since married women can no longer be employed as air hostesses. Unfortunately, just as she was about to take her last flight as an air hostess, she meets with a tragic air crash while take off that leads to her death. Her death leaves Sata bereaved and unable to live with the fond memories of the past, he leaves Kolkata and goes to Africa where his former boss, Mr. Marco Polo has opened a new hotel and is more than willing to have him as his old fond worker. Thereafter, the fate of Sata Bose remains unknown.
 Ms. Karabi Guha, played by Supriya Devi, is a housekeeper and hostess at the guest house owned by Mr. Aggarwal who is apparently a friend of the Pakrashis (see below). She takes a leading role in helping close an important deal with the German businessmen who are visiting Kolkata. When she learns of the plot of Mrs. Pakrashi's (see below) brother in jeopardizing the business agreement, she alerts Anindya Pakrashi. Eventually, Anindya and Karabi fall in love. However, when Mrs. Pakrashi learns this, she insults Karabi and warns her to leave Anindya in exchange for money. Eventually, in the middle of an intense altercation, Karabi shows the pictures of Mrs. Pakrashi with her boyfriends. This leaves Mrs. Pakrashi stunned and agrees to let Karabi marry Anindya. However, later, thinking about this incident, Karabi feels an intense sense of guilt for her actions. Unable to confront with her feelings, she decides to end her life.
 Anindya Pakrashi, played by Biswajit is the son of a renowned business personality of Kolkata, Mr. Madhab Pakrashi. He is shown to be as well mannered, humble and friendly. After returning from the West, Madhab Pakrashi entrusts him with dealing with the German businessmen. In his effort, Anindya finds Karabi to be extremely helpful. Eventually, Karabi and Anindya fall in love. When unable to confront with her feelings, Karabi kills herself, it leaves him heart-broken and dumbfounded. The fate of Anindya Pakrashi remains unclear after this incident.
 Madhab Pakrashi is a renowned business man of Kolkata. Remaining busy and out of town most of the time, he is unaware of his wife's infidelity. His only son, Anindya is educated abroad. When his son returns to Kolkata, he entrusts Anindya with dealing with the German businessmen.
 Mrs. Pakrashi, wife of the renowned businessman Madhab Pakrasi leads a double life. In the morning, she devotes herself to social work appearing as a perfect Bengali woman. At night, she visits the hotel in disguise and spends nights with her then boyfriend. As per Sata Bose, she engages in short term sexual relationships with different men at different times. Apparently, as shown in the movie, only Sata Bose, Shankar and Karabi know about her infidelity and double life.
 Sujata Mitra, played by Anjana Bhowmick, is an air hostess by profession. Her family lives in Mumbai. As an air hostess, she spends her nights serving the passengers on board and lives at the hotels in the various cities where her work takes her. Sata finds her simple minded, smart and attractive and falls in love with her. She too commits to Sata and buys him a new apartment where they would spend their life together once married. Unfortunately, on her last flight as an air hostess, before leaving her profession, her plane has an accident and she dies. This accident leaves Sata bereaved and heart-broken.

Cast
 Uttam Kumar as Mr. Satyasundar Bose/Sata
 Subhendu Chatterjee as Shankar
 Supriya Devi as Ms. Karabi Guha
 Biswajit Chatterjee as Anindya Pakrashi
 Anjana Bhowmick as Ms. Sujata Mitra
 Utpal Dutt as Marco Polo
 Bhanu Bandopadhyay as Nityahari Babu
 Haradhan Banerjee as Jimmy
 Sukhen Das as Gurberia

Soundtrack

Production
The film is based on Mani Shankar Mukherjee's novel Chowronghee. Pinaki Bhusan Mukherjee directed the film, with music composed and also produced by Ashima Bhattachariya.

Film production started during 1967–1968. For the film shooting, staff were booked to the Grand Hotel of Kolkata. The film shooted in Grand Hotel and Technicians Studio, both place. There is two main protagonists Sata Bose the character played by Uttam, and a writer Shankar played by Subhendu Chatterjee. During the starting of the shooting Subhendu had scheduling problems because he was attending in the Frankfurt Festival for his film Panchashwaar. Then he contacted Uttam to pause filming. Then Uttam requested to the producer and director to start filming a few days later.

Reception
Released in Durga Puja occasion in 1968 the film generally became superhit and ran to full houses for 112 consecutive days in theater. Film become huge popular and received huge acclaim like novel, but novel and the film both did not receive any awards, and also Uttam never got any awards for his outstanding performance in the film. The film earned the cult status.

Award
Bengal Film Journalists Association Award
1969 : Bengal Film Journalists Association - Best Female Playback Singer Award - Pratima Banerjee

Remakes
National Award winner director Srijit Mukherjee made a film based on this in 2019, Shahjahan Regency.

References

External links 

1968 films
Bengali-language Indian films
Films set in Kolkata
1960s Bengali-language films
Films based on Indian novels
Films based on works by Mani Shankar Mukherjee